Ramón Alfredo Sánchez Paredes (born May 25, 1982 in San Juan Opico) is a Salvadoran football player. He was banned for life in 2013, for match fixing while playing for the El Salvador national football team.

Career

Club
Sánchez has played professionally with Juventud Independiente, Arcense, San Salvador, Chalatenango and Alianza in the first division in El Salvador. He scored three goals in the 2009 season for Alianza, which was good for second most on the team. In total he has played 227 games in the Salvadoran first division and scored 19 goals.

Sánchez joined the San Jose Earthquakes of Major League Soccer in 2009, and scored two goals in 10 appearances with the team in his debut year. He was later released from the team on June 29, 2010.

In late July 2010, Sánchez signed a one-year contract with Águila, after having spent some time with the San Jose Earthquakes of the Major League Soccer. After his contract expired with Aguila, he made a move to Isidro Metapán for the Apertura 2011.

In February 2013 Sánchez signed with Kazakh team FC Vostok to play in the Kazakhstan Premier League.

Following his Life Ban, Sánchez signed for Iraqi Premier League side Zakho FC, since the Iraqi Premier League is not being recognised by FIFA. Subsequently, fellow banned teammates José Henríquez and Cristian Castillo joined Duhok SC, who also play in the Iraqi Premier League.

International
In 2002 Sánchez won the gold medal with the Salvadoran U22 team in the Juegos Deportivos Centroamericanos, beating Mexico in the final.

Sánchez made his senior debut for El Salvador in a June 2003 friendly match against Honduras and has, as of February 2012, earned a total of 69 caps, scoring 2 goals. He has represented his country in 22 FIFA World Cup qualification matches and played at the 2001 UNCAF Nations Cup as well as at the 2003, 2007, 2009 and 2011 CONCACAF Gold Cups.

On September 20, 2013, Sánchez was one of 14 El Salvador players banned for life due to their involvement with match fixing.

International goals

Honours

Domestic
 Salvadoran Primera División: Clausura 2003, Apertura 2011

International
 2002 Central American and Caribbean Games
 2010 FIFA World Cup qualification (CONCACAF)
 2006 FIFA World Cup qualification

References

External links
 El Grafico Profile 
 

1982 births
Living people
People from La Libertad Department (El Salvador)
Association football midfielders
Salvadoran footballers
El Salvador international footballers
2003 CONCACAF Gold Cup players
2007 CONCACAF Gold Cup players
2009 UNCAF Nations Cup players
2009 CONCACAF Gold Cup players
2011 CONCACAF Gold Cup players
C.D. Juventud Independiente players
San Salvador F.C. footballers
C.D. Chalatenango footballers
Alianza F.C. footballers
San Jose Earthquakes players
C.D. Águila footballers
A.D. Isidro Metapán footballers
FC Vostok players
Major League Soccer players
Kazakhstan Premier League players
Salvadoran expatriate footballers
Expatriate soccer players in the United States
Expatriate footballers in Kazakhstan
Sportspeople involved in betting scandals
Sportspeople banned for life
Salvadoran expatriate sportspeople in Kazakhstan
Salvadoran expatriate sportspeople in the United States
Salvadoran expatriate sportspeople in Iraq
Expatriate footballers in Iraq